Route 386 is a 75 km two-lane east/west highway located in the Abitibi-Témiscamingue region in Quebec, Canada. It starts at the junction of Route 111 close to Amos and ends at the junction of Route 113 in Senneterre.

Towns along Route 386

 Amos
 Landrienne
 Barraute
 Belcourt
 Senneterre

See also
 List of Quebec provincial highways

References

External links 
 Provincial Route Map (Courtesy of the Quebec Ministry of Transportation) 
 Route 386 on Google Maps

386